Andrés Gerardo Mendoza Rivera (born 26 December 1995) is a Mexican footballer who plays as a midfielder.

References

1995 births
Living people
Mexican footballers
Association football midfielders
Correcaminos UAT footballers
Irapuato F.C. footballers
Ascenso MX players
Liga Premier de México players
Tercera División de México players
Footballers from Jalisco
People from Ocotlán, Jalisco